KLOO-FM (106.3 MHz) is a commercial radio station licensed to serve Corvallis, Oregon, United States.  The station is owned by Bicoastal Media and the broadcast license is held by Bicoastal Media Licenses V, LLC. KLOO-FM broadcasts a classic rock music format to the Salem, Oregon, and Mid-Willamette Valley areas. The station is an affiliate of the syndicated Pink Floyd program "Floydian Slip."

The station was reassigned the KLOO-FM call sign by the Federal Communications Commission on January 8, 1997.

References

External links
KLOO-FM official website

LOO-FM
Benton County, Oregon
Classic rock radio stations in the United States
Radio stations established in 1973
1973 establishments in Oregon